Renzo Giampaoli (born 7 January 2000) is an Argentine footballer currently playing as a centre-back for Boca Juniors.

Career
On 30 January 2022, he joined Norwegian Eliteserien club Rosenborg on loan until the end of the 2022 season.

Career statistics

Club

Notes

References

2000 births
Living people
People from Constitución Department
Argentine footballers
Argentine expatriate footballers
Association football defenders
Argentine Primera División players
Boca Juniors footballers
Rosenborg BK players
Expatriate footballers in Norway
Argentine expatriate sportspeople in Norway
Sportspeople from Santa Fe Province